Pavis may refer to:

 Pavise, a mediaeval shield
 Pavis: Threshold to Danger, a tabletop role-playing game
 Patrice Pavis (born 1947), British academic
 Yvonne Pavis (1890–?), English actress and writer

See also 
 Pavis Wood, an area in England
 Hyundai Pavise, a truck model
 Pavice, a village in Bosnia and Herzegovina